The 1918–19 WPI Engineers men's basketball team represented Worcester Polytechnic Institute during the 1918–19 NCAA men's basketball season. They were coached by Henry C.  Swasey. The Engineers played their home games at Alumni Gym in Worcester, Massachusetts. The team finished the season with 8 wins and 5 losses.

References

WPI Engineers men's basketball seasons